Kevin Christopher O'Shea (July 10, 1925 – February 21, 2003) was an All-American college basketball player who later played professionally.  He was born in San Francisco, California.

A 6'2" guard from the University of Notre Dame, O'Shea was selected by the Minneapolis Lakers with the tenth pick of the 1950 NBA draft. He played three seasons in the NBA with the Lakers, Milwaukee Hawks, and Baltimore Bullets, averaging 5.2 points per game.

References

External links
University of Notre Dame profile on O'Shea

1925 births
2003 deaths
All-American college men's basketball players
American men's basketball players
Baltimore Bullets (1944–1954) players
Basketball players from San Francisco
Guards (basketball)
Milwaukee Hawks players
Minneapolis Lakers draft picks
Minneapolis Lakers players
Notre Dame Fighting Irish men's basketball players
Wilkes-Barre Barons players